Salem Township is a township in Dunklin County, in the U.S. state of Missouri.

Salem Township was erected in 1845, and most likely was named after Salem, Massachusetts, the native home of a share of the first settlers.The two biggest cities in the township are Senath and Arbyrd.

References

Townships in Missouri
Townships in Dunklin County, Missouri